The sixth and final season of the historical drama television series Vikings premiered on December 4, 2019, on History in Canada.  The series broadly follows the exploits of the legendary Viking chieftain Ragnar Lothbrok and his crew, and later those of his sons. 

The sixth season consists of a double-season order of twenty episodes, split into two parts of ten episodes; the second half was released in its entirety on December 30, 2020 on Amazon Prime Video in Ireland, the United States, the United Kingdom, Germany, and Austria, ahead of its broadcast on History in Canada from January 1 to March 3, 2021. The season focuses on King Bjorn's reign over Kattegat, Ivar's adventures in Rus' and Wessex, and Ubbe's expeditions to Iceland and North America (Greenland and Mi'kma'ki/Canada).

Cast

Main
 Katheryn Winnick as Lagertha, a shield-maiden, Ragnar's first wife and former queen of Kattegat (part 1)
 Alexander Ludwig as King Bjorn Ironside, Ragnar and Lagertha's son, king of Kattegat, and husband to Gunnhild and Ingrid.
 Nathan O'Toole portrays a young Bjorn Ironside, appearing in a flashback
 Alex Høgh Andersen as King Ivar the Boneless, fourth son of Ragnar and Aslaug and former king of Kattegat. After fleeing Kattegat, he finds refuge in Rus'.
 Marco Ilsø as Hvitserk, second son of Ragnar and Aslaug. After the death of Thora, he becomes a drunkard.
 Jordan Patrick Smith as Ubbe, eldest son of Ragnar and Aslaug and Torvi's husband
 Danila Kozlovsky as Prince Oleg the Prophet, the Varangian grand prince of Kiev who welcomes Ivar at his court
 John Kavanagh as The Seer, the former seiðrmann of Kattegat, appearing in visions
 Peter Franzén as King Harald Finehair, a Viking warlord intended to become the first King of All Norway
 Eric Johnson as King Erik, an outlaw who helps Bjorn. After Harald's departure for England, he makes himself King of Kattegat alongside Queen Ingrid.
 Georgia Hirst as Torvi, Ubbe's wife and a shield-maiden. She was once Bjorn's spouse.
 Ragga Ragnars as Queen Gunnhild, Bjorn's wife, queen of Kattegat and a shield-maiden
 Ray Stevenson as Othere, a mysterious wanderer
 Gustaf Skarsgård as Floki, a gifted shipbuilder (part 2)
 Jasper Pääkkönen as Halfdan the Black, Harald's violent younger brother, appearing in a vision (part 2)

Recurring

 Lucy Martin as Queen Ingrid, a slave serving Gunnhild and Bjorn in Kattegat and, later, Bjorn's second wife. After Bjorn's death, she marries King Harald and becomes Queen of Kattegat.
 Kieran O'Reilly as White Hair, Ivar's former bodyguard and an outlaw (part 1)
 Kristy Dawn Dinsmore as Amma, a shield-maiden in Kattegat who is fond of Hvitserk
 Andrei Claude as Ganbaatar, Oleg's captain
 Elodie Curry as Asa, Bjorn and Torvi's daughter
 Ryan Henson as Hali, Bjorn and Torvi's son
 Adam Copeland as Kjetill Flatnose (/ʃjetil/), the chief of the Icelandic settlement
 Lenn Kudrjawizki as Prince Dir of Novgorod, Oleg's brother
 Oran Glynn O'Donovan as Prince Igor, the preadolescent heir of Kiev and Oleg's ward
 Serena Kennedy (part 1) and Isabelle Connolly (part 2) as Anna, Dir's wife
 Steven Berkoff as King Olaf the Stout
 Conn Rogers as Canute, a member of King Olaf's court
 Eve Connolly as Thora, Hvitserk's murdered love interest, appearing in his delusions
 Gina Costigan as Runa, a former shield-maiden at Lagertha's village
 David Sterne as Gudmund, an old man at Lagertha's village
 Kathy Monahan as Eira, a former shield-maiden at Lagertha's village
 Oisin Murray as Tarben, a young boy at Lagertha's village
 Aoibheann McCann as Skadi, a shield-maiden under Gunnhild's command
 Alicia Agneson as Princess Katia, Oleg's wife
 Fredrik Hiller as Jarl Thorkell the Tall, one of the jarls of Norway and a rival to Bjorn
 Amy De Bhrún as Jarl Hrolf, one the jarls of Norway
 Mishaël Lopes Cardozo as King Hakon, one of the kings of Norway and a rival to Bjorn
 Kelly Campbell as Ingvild, Kjetill's wife
 Scott Graham as Frodi, Kjetill's son
 Brent Burns as Skane, one of Harald's ambitious followers
 Ivo Alexandre as Bishop Leon, who visits Kiev for Easter
 Noella Brennan as Gudrid, a settler in Ubbe's party
 Ian Lloyd Anderson as Naad, a settler in Ubbe's party
 Ferdia Walsh-Peelo as King Alfred, the ruler of Wessex
 Róisín Murphy as Queen Elsewith, King Alfred's wife
 Wesley French as Peminuit, a Miꞌkmaq warrior
 Phillip Lewitski as We'jitu, Peminuit's younger brother
 Russell Balogh as Bishop Aldulf, a warrior priest in King Alfred's army
 Breffni Holahan as Sister Annis, a nun who assists Queen Elsewith
 Brendan McCormack as Leof, a soldier in King Alfred's army
 Oliver Price as Galan, a soldier in King Alfred's army
 Dafhyd Flynn as Adam, a soldier in King Alfred's army
 Tim Creed as Orlyg, a slave in the service of King Erik in Kattegat
 Carmen Moore as Pekitaulet, Peminuit and We'jitu's mother and the Sagamaw of her tribe
 Ellyn Jade as Nikani, Peminuit's wife
 Acahkos Johnson as Na'pa'tes, a Miꞌkmaq child
 Victoire Dauxerre as Nissa, a slave in the service of Queen Ingrid in Kattegat
 Sean McGillicuddy as Osric, Bishop Aldulf's second-in-command

Guest
 Martin Maloney as Vigrid, Ivar's travel companion (part 1)
 Blake Kubena as Prince Askold of Novgorod, Oleg's brother
 Sandy Kennedy as Sylvi, a former shield-maiden at Lagertha's village
 Neil Keery as Alexei, a guard in Kiev
 Jinny Lofthouse as Hild, a shield-maiden under Gunnhild's command
 Emma Willis as Gyda, a shield maiden that volunteers as a sacrifice 
 Karen Connell as the Angel of Death, a völva
 Adam Winnick as Rangvald, Harald's captain
 Emma Eliza Regan as Aoife, a villager from Istrehågan
 Ronan Summers as Herigar, one of Erik's warriors
 Katherine Devlin as Natasha, at Oleg's court
 Noah Syndergaard as Thorbjorn, a Viking warrior in Kattegat
 Jerry-Jane Pears as Iðunn, the goddess of youth, who appears to Hvitserk
 Bryan Larkin as Wiglaf, a Saxon commander

Norwegian actor and YouTuber Per Fredrik Åsly (better known as PelleK) appears in "All the Prisoners", "The Key" and "Resurrection" as an envoy from Ubbe's trade expedition. Polish singer Anna Maria Jopek appears in "Death and the Serpent", performing the song "Lagertha's Lament" alongside musician Maciej Rychly. She returns in "The Ice Maiden" to dub Georgia Hirst as Torvi when she sings at Lagertha's funeral.

Episodes

Production

Development
An Irish-Canadian co-production presented by Metro-Goldwyn-Mayer, the sixth and final season of Vikings was developed and produced by TM Productions and Take 5 Productions. Morgan O'Sullivan, Sheila Hockin, Sherry Marsh, Alan Gasmer, James Flynn, John Weber, and Michael Hirst are credited as executive producers. This season was produced by Keith Thompson for the first eleven episodes, and Liz Gill for the remaining nine episodes. Bill Goddard and Séamus McInerney are co-producers.

The production team for this season includes casting directors Frank and Nuala Moiselle, costume designer Susan O'Connor Cave, visual effects supervisor Dominic Remane, stunt action designer Richard Ryan, composer Trevor Morris, production designer Mark Geraghty, editors Aaron Marshall for the first, fourth, eighth, tenth, twelfth, fifteenth, seventeenth and twentieth episodes, Tad Seaborn for the second, fifth, seventh, ninth, thirteenth, sixteenth and nineteenth episodes, and Dan Briceno for the third, sixth, eleventh, fourteenth and eighteenth episodes and cinematographers Peter Robertson for the first to third, seventh to thirteenth, and sixteenth to twentieth episodes, Owen McPolin for the fourth to sixth episodes, and PJ Dillon for the fourteenth and fifteenth episodes.

The eighth episode of the season, "Valhalla Can Wait", was directed by actress Katheryn Winnick, who portrays Lagertha in the series.

Writing
According to the series's creator and writer Michael Hirst, the idea to explore Oleg the Prophet came to him due to the influence Vikings played in Russian history: "I didn't know that Russia is called Russia because it was founded by the Rus Vikings. I learned so much myself and I always do learn when we go different places and explore new cultures and forgotten languages. [...] I was reading books about the Silk Road and about the Rus Vikings and then I read about Prince Oleg, the prophet. He was this extraordinary ruler of Russia and it all kind of fit into place. It seemed the most obvious. It’s also one of the most exciting things to do because we'd been traveling west so much and it seemed logical to go east again. It was an idea that slowly fermented in my mind."

Casting
In September 2017, it was announced that Russian actor Danila Kozlovsky would join the cast for the sixth season as Oleg of Novgorod, the 10th century Varangian ruler of the Kyivan Rus.

Filming

This season is set in areas corresponding to modern Ukraine and Norway, but filming locations included Vik, Norway, standing in for the home of the Rus' Vikings of Kiev, and County Wicklow, Ireland. Some scenes were also shot outside Dublin, at the River Boyne (County Meath), Blessington lakes and Powerscourt Waterfall, Powerscourt Estate (County Wicklow) and at Nuns Beach at Ballybunion (County Kerry) standing in for the Icelandic coast. Scenes that take place in Kattegat were shot in Lough Tay (County Wicklow). Ashford Studios (County Wicklow) were again used as the base for  production, where those scenes requiring the use of green screens for CGI were shot.

Music

The musical score for the sixth and final season was composed by Trevor Morris. Einar Selvik did not return to collaborate with Morris on new original music for the final season. The opening sequence is again accompanied by the song "If I Had a Heart" by Fever Ray, with the final ten episodes featuring a remix of the song by Tim Hecker in place of the original.

The soundtrack album was released on December 6, 2019 by Sony Classical Records. Two original songs not included in the album are "Lament for Lagertha" and "Lagertha's Funeral Music", both written by Maciej Rychly & Alicja Bral and performed by Anna Maria Jopek and the Goat Theater Performers, featured in "Death and the Serpent" and "The Ice Maiden", respectively. The Skaldic version of "Snake Pit Poetry", an original song by Einar Selvik which was first included in "All His Angels", is featured in "The Best Laid Plans".

Additional non-original music by Norwegian music group Wardruna is featured in the episodes "Ghosts, Gods and Running Dogs", "The Key", "The Ice Maiden" and "The Last Act". The featured tracks are "Tyr", "Helvegen", "Isa" and "Vindavla".

Music by Danish folk project Danheim is also featured in this season's soundtrack in the episodes "Resurrection", "The Best Laid Plans", "The Signal" and "The Raft of Medusa". The featured tracks are "Vanheimr", "Tyrfing", "Floki's Last Journey", "Gripir", "Munarvagr" and "Hefja Blót".

Additional music by folk band Heilung is featured in the episode "The Best Laid Plans". The featured tracks are "Fylgija Ear", "Hamrer Hippyer" and "Alfadhirhaiti". "Fra Stjerner till Jorda" by Norwegian artist Runahild is also featured in "The Best Laid Plans". "Hlidskjalf" by Osi and the Jupiter is featured in "The Raft of the Medusa". The pieces "Babel" and "Grigori" from the album The Word as Power by Lustmord appear in "The Best Laid Plans" and "All at Sea".

Reception 
The review aggregator website Rotten Tomatoes reported a perfect 100% approval rating, with an average rating of 7.8/10 based on 12 reviews.

Historical inaccuracies 
The depiction of Kievan Rus during Prince Oleg's rule (879–912) has been noted as substantially inaccurate by fans and the media. Most notably, in the series Christianity is introduced in Kievan Rus too early, as are Mongol clothing and armor and hot air balloons.

Notes

References

External links
 
 

2019 Canadian television seasons
2019 Irish television seasons
2020 Canadian television seasons
2020 Irish television seasons
2021 Canadian television seasons
Split television seasons
Cultural depictions of Harald Fairhair